Gibberula vomoensis is a species of very small sea snail, a marine gastropod mollusk or micromollusk in the family Cystiscidae.

Description

Distribution
This marine species occurs off the Fidji Islands.

References

vomoensis
Gastropods described in 2004